Springville is an unincorporated community in Pontotoc County, Mississippi.

It is part of the Tupelo Micropolitan Statistical Area.

References

Unincorporated communities in Pontotoc County, Mississippi
Unincorporated communities in Mississippi